Bae, also spelled Bai or Pae, is a Korean family name. The South Korean census of 2015 found 400,641 people by this surname, or less than 1% of the population. In a study by the National Institute of the Korean Language based on 2007 application data for South Korean passports, it was found that 96.8% of people with this family name spelled it in Latin letters as Bae. Rarer alternative spellings (the remaining 3.2%) included Bai, Pae, and Bea.

There are two different ways to write the name in hanja: the most common, and an alternative which lacks the "stem" (Radical 8) at the top. The most common character is also used to write the Chinese surname Pei, which is also the origin of the Vietnamese surname Bùi.

Notable people
Bae Doona (배두나, born 1979), South Korean actress
Bae Eun-sik (배은식), South Korean actor
Bae Hae-min (배해민, born 1988), South Korean footballer
Bae Jeong-min (배정민, born 1975), South Korean voice actress
Bae Jong-ok (배종옥, born 1964), South Korean actress
Bae Ki-jong (배기종, born 1983), South Korean footballer
Bae Ki-sung (배기성, born 1972), South Korean singer
Bae Seul-ki (배슬기, born 1986), South Korean singer
Bae Seong-woo (배성우, born 1972), South Korean actor
Bae Soo-bin (배수빈, born 1976), South Korean actor
Bae Sung-jae (배성재, born 1978), South Korean television personality
Bae Suzy (배수지, born 1994), South Korean actress, singer and former member of girl group Miss A
Bae Sang-moon (배상문, born 1986), South Korean professional golfer
Bae Woo-hee (배우희, born 1991), South Korean singer, member of girl group Dal Shabet
Bae Yong-joon (배용준, born 1972), South Korean actor
Bae Yong-kyun (배용균, born 1951), South Korean film director
Bae Young-soo (배영수, born 1981), South Korean baseball player
Ji-hwan Bae (born 1999), South Korean baseball player
Chae Soo-bin (Bae Soo-bin 배수빈, born 1994), South Korean actress
Irene (Bae Joo-hyun 배주현, born 1991), South Korean singer, member of girl group Red Velvet
Pae Kil-su (배길수, born 1972), North Korean gymnast
Pae Tal-jun (배달준, born 1936), high-ranking North Korean politician and bureaucrat
Tak Jae-hoon (배성우 Bae Sung-woo, born 1968), South Korean entertainer
Bae Jin-young (배진영, born 2000), South Korean singer, member of boy group CIX
Bae In-hyuk (배인혁, born 1998), South Korean actor
Punch (Bae Jin-young 배진영, born 1993), South Korean singer
Bae Yoon-kyung (배윤경, born 1993), South Korean actress
Bae Yoo-na (배유나, born 1989), South Korean volleyball player
Bae Yeon-ju (배연주, born 1990), South Korean badminton player
Bae Noo-ri (배누리, born 1993), South Korean actress
Bae Young-soo (배영수, born 1981), South Korean baseball player

See also
Korean name
List of people of Korean descent

References

Korea-related lists
Korean-language surnames